Carabdytes alutaceus is an endangered species of beetle in the family Dytiscidae. It is endemic to New Caledonia, in the southwest Pacific Ocean.

This species was formerly a member of the genus Rhantus.

References

alutaceus
Insects of New Caledonia
Beetles described in 1883
Taxonomy articles created by Polbot
Taxobox binomials not recognized by IUCN